This is a list of Big West Conference champions in college baseball.  The Big West Conference is composed of nine schools which participate in baseball, with each school playing all of the others in three game series.  The team with the best record is named champion, and wins the league's automatic bid to the NCAA Division I Baseball Championship.

The conference began sponsoring baseball under the name Pacific Coast Athletic Association in 1970 and crowned a champion each year through 1976.  Beginning in 1977, the league joined with the West Coast Conference for baseball, with competition in two separate conferences - the Northern California Baseball Association and the Southern California Baseball Association.  This arrangement lasted through the 1984 season, when the league once again began sponsoring baseball for its members.  In 1988, the conference adopted the Big West name.  In 1990, the league held a divisional playoff, and in 1997 and 1998, the league held a tournament to determine its champion.

Champions

Pacific Coast Athletic Association

Northern California Baseball Association

Southern California Baseball Association

Pacific Coast Athletic Association/Big West Conference

References

Champions
Big West Conference